Of Machines was an American post-hardcore band from Atlanta, Georgia, United States. Formed in 2006, the band was originally known as We Are Kings. The band released their debut and only album As If Everything Was Held in Place on March 3, 2009, on Rise Records.

History
Of Machines was formed in 2006 by then-original members Austin Thornton, Bennett Freeman, Dylan Anderson, Mark Tanner, Michael Matejick and Jonathan Lugo. While recording their album with producer and guest vocalist Cameron Mizell at Chango Gridlock Studios in (Casselberry, Florida),the band sought the attention of various record labels. The band decided to sign to Rise Records on October 14, 2008. Soon after the release of their debut album in 2009, the band embarked on touring their region to which their debut album was well received and gained much significance.

As If Everything Was Held in Place is the only album the band has released as Of Machines. Vocalist Dylan Anderson left the band in 2010 on undisputed grounds, following Andersons departure the band entered a three-year hiatus. They reformed in 2013 as the original line up with the ambition to record a new EP dubbed Chroma Season/Chroma Dreamcoat which spawned demos, All Along The Greyscale and An Autobiography In Vivid Color Pt. 2 found on their YouTube channel. With the anticipation to release an EP in the latter part of 2013, the band asked for support of fans to contribute to a Crowdfund on Kickstarter to help with the production of the EP.

After a period of silence and uncertainty, the band informed fans of ill-fated news that the EP could not be completed due to the absence of the band's vocalist Anderson and the disappearance of the Crowdfund. The subsequent news led to the domino effect of all members disbanding in 2015 and also the release of untitled compilation of demos. Later vocalist Anderson took to Facebook and issued a statement in regards to his absence and disappearance of the crowdfund.

On May 30th, 2022 unclean vocalist Bennett Freeman unexpectedly passed away at the age of 30.

Musical style
Of Machines is categorized as Post-hardcore, Electronic rock, Ambient rock, Alternative rock. Their style is credited as a landmark of the post-hardcore genre in terms of innovation, musicianship and deliverance.

Band members

Final line up
 Dylan Anderson  - lead vocals (2006-2010, 2013–2015)
 Bennett Freeman  - unclean vocals, keyboards, synthesizers (2006–2010, 2013–2015; died 2022)
 Mark Tanner - bass guitar, backing vocals (2006–2010, 2013–2015)
 Michael Matejick - guitarist, backing vocals (2006–2010, 2013–2015)
 Jonathan Lugo - guitarist, backing vocals (2006–2010, 2013–2015)

Past members
 Austin Thornton - drums, percussion  (2006 - 2009)
 Brent Guistwite - drums, percussion  (2010)
 Loniel Robinson - drums, percussion (2009-2010)

Session musicians
 Cameron Mizell - guest vocals (2009)

Discography
Studio albums
 As If Everything Was Held in Place (2009)

Miscellaneous demos
 An Autobiography In Vivid Color Pt. 2 (2013)
 All Along The Greyscale (2013)
 Chroma Season/Chroma Dreamcoat EP untitled demos (2015)

References

Rise Records artists
Musical groups from Atlanta
American post-hardcore musical groups
Musical groups established in 2006